The 2013 McCoy's Premier League Darts was a darts tournament organised by the Professional Darts Corporation; the ninth edition of the tournament. The event began at the Odyssey Arena in Belfast on 7 February, and ended at The O2 Arena, London on 16 May. The tournament was shown live on Sky Sports in the UK and Ireland.

Phil Taylor was the defending champion and he reached the final again this year, but lost 10–8 against Michael van Gerwen who won his first Premier League title on his debut appearance in the competition.

Qualification
The qualification format was different from the last edition of Premier League Darts. The top four players from the PDC Order of Merit after the 2013 PDC World Darts Championship automatically qualified. Alongside them, six (instead of four) additional players were chosen on the basis of their performance in the past year or in earlier editions of the Premier League. After the first nine rounds, the bottom 2 players were relegated. All players played each other once at that point. The remaining eight then competed against each other in the final five rounds for the play-offs places. All games in the league stage were played "best of 12 legs" (instead of "best of 14 legs"), thus games could be drawn by 6–6.

Venues
The venues remained the same as in the last Premier League Darts edition.

Prize money
The prize-money was increased to £520,000 from £450,000 in 2012.

Results

League stage

7 February – week 1 (Phase 1)
 Odyssey Arena, Belfast

14 February – week 2 (Phase 1)
 AECC, Aberdeen

21 February – week 3 (Phase 1)
 Bournemouth International Centre, Bournemouth

28 February – Week 4 (Phase 1)
 Westpoint Arena, Exeter

7 March – Week 5 (Phase 1)
 Capital FM Arena, Nottingham

14 March – Week 6 (Phase 1)
 MEN Arena, Manchester

21 March – Week 7 (Phase 1)
 Cardiff International Arena, Cardiff

28 March – Week 8 (Phase 1)
 SECC, Glasgow

4 April – Week 9 (Phase 1)
 Brighton Centre, Brighton

11 April – week 10 (Phase 2)
 Motorpoint Arena, Sheffield

18 April – week 11 (Phase 2)
 The O2, Dublin

25 April – week 12 (Phase 2)
 National Indoor Arena, Birmingham

2 May – week 13 (Phase 2)
 Echo Arena, Liverpool

9 May – week 14 (Phase 2)
 Metro Radio Arena, Newcastle upon Tyne

Play-offs – 16 May
 The O2 Arena, London

Table and streaks

Table
{| class="wikitable sortable" style="text-align:center;"
|-
! style="width:10px;" abbr="Position"|#
!width=200 |Name
! style="width:20px;" abbr="Played"|Pld
! style="width:20px;" abbr="Won"|W
! style="width:20px;" abbr="Drawn"|D
! style="width:20px;" abbr="Lost"|L
! style="width:20px;" abbr="Points"|Pts
! style="width:20px;" abbr="Legs For"|LF
! style="width:20px;" abbr="Legs Against"|LA
! style="width:20px;" abbr="Leg Difference"|+/-
! style="width:20px;" abbr="Legs Won Against Throw"|LWAT
! style="width:20px;" abbr="Tons"|100+
! style="width:20px;" abbr="Ton Plus"|140+
! style="width:20px;" abbr="Maximums"|180s
! style="width:20px;" abbr="Average"|A
! style="width:20px;" abbr="High Checkout"|HC
! style="width:20px;" abbr="Checkout Percentage"|C%
|- bgcolor=#ccffcc
!1
|align=left|  || 16 || 11 || 2 || 3 ||24|| 102 || 68 || +34 ||  ||  ||  ||  ||  || 164 || 38.65%
|- bgcolor=#ccffcc
!2
|align=left|  || 16 || 10 || 3 || 3 ||23|| 98 || 74 || +24 ||  ||  ||  ||  ||  || 161 || 60.72% 
|- bgcolor=#ccffcc
!3
|align=left|   RU || 16 || 8 || 4 || 4 ||20|| 95 || 73 || +22 ||  ||  ||  ||  ||  || 164 || 41.14% 
|- bgcolor=#ccffcc 
!4
|align=left|   || 16 || 7 || 3 || 6 ||17|| 88 || 82 || +6 ||  ||  ||  ||  ||  || 170 ||  61.43%
|- bgcolor=#ffcccc
!5
|align=left|   || 16 || 6 || 3 || 7 ||15|| 81 || 88 || −7 ||  ||  ||  ||  ||  || 161 || 40.78% 
|- bgcolor=#ffcccc
!6
|align=left|   || 16 || 7 || 1 || 8 ||15|| 81 || 90 || −9 ||  ||  ||  ||  ||  || 140 || 40.30%
|- bgcolor=#ffcccc
!7
|align=left|   || 16 || 6 || 0 || 10 ||12|| 82 || 93 || −11 ||  ||  ||  ||  ||  || 152 || 38.48%
|- bgcolor=#ffcccc
!8
|align=left|   || 16 || 4 || 2 || 10 ||10|| 73 || 100 || −27 ||  ||  ||  ||  ||  || 170 || 33.14% 
|-bgcolor=#ffcccc
!9
|align=left|   || 9 || 2 || 1 || 6 ||5|| 42 || 56 || −14 ||  ||  ||  ||  ||  || 132 || 36.52% 
|- bgcolor=#ffcccc
!10
|align=left|   || 9 || 2 || 1 || 6 ||5|| 40 || 58 || −18 ||  ||  ||  ||  ||  || 124 || 27.97% 

Bottom two eliminated after Week 9. Top four qualified for the Play-offs after Week 14.
NB: LWAT = Legs Won Against Throw. 
A = Average
C% = Checkout Percentage
HC = High Checkout.
Players separated by +/- leg difference if tied. If leg difference is equal the table is sorted by the player's LWAT. If it is still tied, ranking is determined by average.

Streaks

Positions by round

References

2013
Premier League Darts
Premier League Darts